Roman Mysteries is a television series based on the series of children's historical novels by Caroline Lawrence. It is reportedly the most expensive British children's TV series to date at £1 million per hour.

The series began filming in June 2006 in Malta, Tunisia and Bulgaria, and was first broadcast from 8 May 2007. The series is divided into "scrolls", each based on one book, starting with The Secrets of Vesuvius. The stories are told in the same order as the book series, except for book 6, The Twelve Tasks of Flavia Gemina, which is transposed to the second series. Books 11 and 12 were not adapted, and the series ends with the adaptation of Book 13. Each scroll consists of two half-hour episodes. The first scroll guest-starred Simon Callow as Pliny the Elder.

On 22 May 2007, after just two episodes, Anne Foy announced on CBBC on BBC One that the show has been postponed due to recent events in the news and would return later in the year on CBBC on BBC One. Since "The Pirates of Pompeii" was about children being kidnapped, the postponement was most likely due to the then recent disappearance of Madeleine McCann. On 19 June the series began broadcasting again from the beginning.

Filming for the second series began on 13 August 2007 and the second series was first broadcast from 8 July 2008.

The series has been successful internationally, and both series have been released on DVD.

Characters
Flavia, played by Francesca Isherwood
Nubia, played by Rebekah Brookes-Murrell
Jonathan, played by Eli Machover
Lupus, played by Harry Stott
Polla Pulchra, played by Millie Binks
Marcus, Flavia's father, played by Eoin McCarthy
Gaius, Flavia's uncle, played by Eoin McCarthy
Mordecai, Jonathan's father, played by Stephen Mapes
Miriam, Jonathan's sister, Gaius's wife, played by Natasha Barrero
Caudex, played by Jamie Baughan (Series 2)
Venalicius, played by Richard Ridings (Series 1)
Aristo, played by Christopher Harper (Series 2)

Episodes

Series overview

Series 1 (2007)

Series 2 (2008)

Differences from the books
 The children are older.
 Lupus is mute but his tongue has not been cut out.
 Because The Thieves of Ostia was not adapted, the meeting of the children takes place at a different time (just before the eruption of Vesuvius) and under different circumstances.
 In the book of "The Assassins of Rome", Simeon is dragged off to be tortured but gets rescued (by Titus) before he is maimed or blinded as was threatened. In the TV series he doesn't get rescued. Although it was improbable for him ever to have been rescued, this is a major plot-change.
 It is Titus's decision for Susannah to stay.
 Susannah says she didn't come to leave Jerusalem because her father had heart attack not because of her love for Jonathan the Zealot.
 Jonathan returns home at the end of "The Enemies of Jupiter".
 "The Gladiators of Capua" and "The Fugitive from Corinth" are set in Ostia, rather than Rome and Greece, respectively.
 Pulchra appears in "The Twelve Tasks of Flavia Gemina" in Jonathan's place.
 Aristo is missing from some of the episodes such as the "Secrets of Vesuvius".
 Several minor characters have been omitted or combined for the television episodes.
 In "The Slave Girl from Jerusalem", a new character, Floridius (played by Mark Benton), was introduced for comic relief.
 When bought as a slave, Nubia's head has not been shaved and she is clothed.
 There is a deliberate effort to dumb down the role of adults, with the notable exception of Doctor Mordecai, Flavia's father no longer pays the extra amount demanded for Nubia and the warm reception she then receives from the house cook is turned into one of hostility and rebuke.

Reception
"Roman Mysteries is a tremendous way for younger viewers to learn about ancient history. Set in the Roman Empire in AD79, it is based on a series of novels by Caroline Lawrence that have sold more than a million copies worldwide. It isn't hard to see why – they graft child-friendly adventure on to careful research, and the same care has been taken to transfer them faithfully to the screen with the help of a strong cast and healthy-looking budget. The first episode this afternoon gives a vivid sense of gladiatorial combat, without the risk of children waking up in the middle of the night screaming." The Times

'Impressively staged children's drama – a sort of Rome for pre-teens – about four friends in AD79.' 
The Independent

'The adventure series set in ancient Rome returns, with some nice acting by the young cast...' 
The Mail on Sunday

'...you certainly don't have to be a child to enjoy this adventure series set in the days of the Roman Empire and boasting some very decent production values, convincing fight scenes and crucially, good storylines.' 
East Anglian Times

References

External links 
 
 
 Roman Mysteries at TV Tropes

2007 British television series debuts
2008 British television series endings
2000s British children's television series
British television shows based on children's books
BBC children's television shows
Television dramas set in ancient Rome
Films set in classical antiquity
-TV series
British children's fantasy television series
2000s British mystery television series
Television series set in the Roman Empire